Bauchi Radio Corporation (BRC) is a broadcast station in Nigeria operated and owned by the Bauchi State Government. It is located on Sir Ahmadu Bello Way in Bauchi, the capital of Bauchi State.
The current managing director of the BRC is Alhaji Surajo Ma'aji.

References

Radio stations in Nigeria